The Crescent Moon Society was a Chinese literary society founded by the poet Xu Zhimo in 1923, which operated until 1931. It was named after The Crescent Moon, a poem by Rabindranath Tagore. The society began as a loosely-organized dining association. In addition to Xu Zhimo, its other members included leading author and educator Hu Shih, poets Wen Yiduo and Chen Mengjia, writers Liang Shih-chiu and Shen Congwen, Rao Mengkan, and sociologist Pan Guangdan.

The Crescent Moon Society—along with other aspects of China's literary establishment at that time—was part of the larger New Culture Movement.

It engaged in running debates with the "art for politics' sake" (and Chinese Communist Party-driven) League of the Left-Wing Writers.

The Society dissolved shortly after the death of Xu Zhimo in November 1931.

See also
 Chinese literature
 Chinese poetry
 Modern Chinese poetry

References 
 Literary Societies of Republican China
 Modern Chinese Literary Thought (p. 497)
 The Columbia Companion to Modern East Asian Literature (p. 368)
 Twentieth-century Chinese Translation Theory (p. 198)
 The Cambridge History of China (p. 430)
 India and China in the Colonial World (p. 94)
 China (p. 355)

Notes

Literary societies
Modern Chinese poetry
Chinese writers' organizations

Further reading 

 Lee, Leo. (1973). The Romantic Generation of Chinese Writers. Harvard University Press. .